Francis Belle is a Barbadian lawyer and judge who has worked as a lawyer and a judge in a number of Commonwealth countries in the Caribbean.

Belle earned Bachelor of Arts and Bachelor of Laws degrees from the University of the West Indies. From 1986 to 1993, he worked as a lawyer in Bridgetown, Barbados. In 1993, he moved to the British Virgin Islands where he worked as Crown counsel until 1997. In 1997, Belle moved to Saint Kitts and Nevis where he worked as the Director of Public Prosecutions for two years; he moved back to the British Virgin Islands in 1998 and worked with a law firm until 2003. In 2003, he was awarded a master of arts in Conflict Analysis and Resolution from Nova Southeastern University.

In 2004, Belle was appointed by the Judicial and Legal Services Commission of the Caribbean Community as a High Court Judge of the Eastern Caribbean Supreme Court. In this role, his first assignment was to reside in and hear cases from Grenada. In 2005, his assignment was changed to sitting on the High Court in Saint Kitts and Nevis. He remained in Saint Kitts until 2010, when he was transferred to sit on the High Court in Saint Lucia.

References
Eastern Caribbean Supreme Court: Saint Lucia
Sheena Brooks, "Justice Francis Belle Reassigned to St Lucia", The St. Kitts-Nevis Observer, 2010-07-02

Living people
Barbadian lawyers
20th-century British Virgin Islands lawyers
Barbadian emigrants to the British Virgin Islands
Barbadian judges on the courts of Grenada
Barbadian judges on the courts of Saint Kitts and Nevis
Barbadian judges on the courts of Saint Lucia
Prosecutors
University of the West Indies alumni
Nova Southeastern University alumni
Eastern Caribbean Supreme Court justices
20th-century Barbadian lawyers
21st-century Barbadian lawyers
Barbadian judges of international courts and tribunals
Year of birth missing (living people)